The 2000 Trans America Athletic Conference men's basketball tournament (now known as the ASUN men's basketball tournament) was held March 1–4 at the Jacksonville Coliseum in Jacksonville, Florida.

In a rematch of the 1999 final, Samford again defeated  in the championship game, 78–69, winning their second TAAC/Atlantic Sun men's basketball tournament.

The Bulldogs, therefore, received the TAAC's automatic bid to the 2000 NCAA tournament.

Format
For the first time since its establishment in 1979, the TAAC tournament expanded beyond 8 teams, with all 10 conference members participating in the 2000 tournament field. 

Centenary (LA) departed the TAAC for the Mid-Continent Conference prior to the 1999–2000 season.

Bracket

References

ASUN men's basketball tournament
Tournament
TAAC men's basketball tournament
TAAC men's basketball tournament